Arnout van de Rijt (born March 29, 1978) is a Dutch sociologist. He studied music at the Utrecht School of the Arts and sociology at Utrecht University. He received his Ph.D. in Sociology from Cornell University in 2007 and worked until 2016 as Assistant and Associate Professor of Sociology at Stony Brook University. Since 2016 he has worked as Professor of Sociology at Utrecht University. In 2018 he was elected member of the European Academy of Sociology. He joined the Department of Political and Social Sciences at the European University Institute (EUI) in September of 2019. He has served as president of the International Network of Analytical Sociology since 2021. He is co-editor-in-chief of the journal Sociological Science.

Awards 
van de Rijt has published extensively in various areas within sociology including social networks, collective action, mathematical sociology, and computational and experimental methods. In 2010 he was awarded the Lynton Freeman award from the International Network for Social Network Analysis and in 2017 the Raymond Boudon prize from the European Academy of Sociology.

Publications 

 Self-Correcting Dynamics in Social Influence Processes. American Journal of Sociology, 2019, 124(5), 1468-1495.
 The Matthew effect in science funding. Proceedings of the National Academy of Sciences, 2018, 115(19), 4887-4890.
 A paper ceiling: Explaining the persistent underrepresentation of women in printed news. American Sociological Review, 2015, 80(5), 960-984
 Field experiments of success-breeds-success dynamics. Proceedings of the National Academy of Sciences, 2014,111(19), 6934-6939.
 Only 15 minutes? The social stratification of fame in printed media. American Sociological Review, 2013. 78(2), 266-289.
 Neighborhood chance and neighborhood change: A comment on Bruch and Mare. American Journal of Sociology, 2009, 114(4), 1166-1180.
 Dynamics of networks if everyone strives for structural holes. American Journal of Sociology, 2008, 114(2), 371-407.

References 

1978 births
Living people
Dutch sociologists
Cornell University alumni
Utrecht University alumni